Flynt is both a surname and a given name. Notable people with the name include:

Surname
Althea Flynt (1953–1987), fourth wife of Larry Flynt, co-publisher the magazine Hustler
Henry Flynt (born 1940), philosopher, avant-garde musician, anti-art activist and exhibited artist
Jimmy Flynt (born 1948), of Larry Flynt Publications (LFP) produces adult videos and magazines, most notably Hustler
John James Flynt, Jr. (1914–2007), United States Representative from Georgia.
Josiah Flynt (1869–1907), American sociologist and author, born at Appleton, Wisc
Larry Flynt (1942–2021), American publisher and the head of Larry Flynt Publications (LFP)
Mike Flynt, linebacker for Division III Sul Ross State University in Alpine, Texas
Wayne Flynt, Professor Emeritus in the Department of History at Auburn University

Given name
Flynt Leverett (born 1958), professor at the Pennsylvania State University School of International Affairs
William Flynt Nichols (1918–1988), Democratic member of United States House of Representatives from Alabama

See also

Flint (disambiguation)